Charli may refer to:
 Charli, Iran, village in Hamadan Province, Iran
 Charli, Rajasthan, village in India
 Charli (album), the third studio album by Charli XCX
 Charli (name)

See also

Carli (given name)
Charla (name)
Charly (name)